Sherman Otis Houghton (April 10, 1828 – August 31, 1914) was an American politician from California. He also married, in succession, two survivors of the Donner Party.

Biography

Early life and education
Houghton was born in New York City, on April 10, 1828. He completed preparatory studies and attended Collegiate Institute in New York.

Career
During the Mexican–American War, Houghton enlisted in the 1st Regiment of New York Volunteers, in June 1846. He arrived in San Francisco, California in 1847 with the rest of his regiment after sailing around Cape Horn. The regiment garrisoned Santa Barbara, before capturing the city of La Paz in Baja California. He was honorably discharged as a lieutenant at Monterey, California, in October 1848.

Houghton then proceeded to mine for gold during the California Gold Rush, and after about six months of mining, he moved to San Jose and entered various commercial businesses. He served as the deputy clerk of the Supreme Court of California in 1854, the same year he was elected to the San Jose Common Council. He was elected the fourth Mayor of San Jose, California from 1855 to 1856. He studied law and was admitted to the bar in 1857, and commenced practice in San Jose.

During the Civil War he was commissioned as a captain and promoted to lieutenant colonel, and served successively as inspector and ordnance officer. After the war, he was elected as a Republican to the Forty-second and Forty-third Congresses (March 4, 1871 – March 3, 1875) and was the chairman of the House Committee on Coinage, Weights, and Measures for the Forty-third Congress. He was an unsuccessful candidate for reelection in 1874 to the Forty-fourth Congress.

He was appointed commissioner to investigate the affairs of the United States Mint at San Francisco in 1881, and moved to Los Angeles in 1886 and continued the practice of law.

Personal life
In 1859, he married Mary Martha Donner, a survivor of the Donner Party; she died a year later, most likely from complications related to the birth of their only child, also named Mary. In 1861, he married his late wife's first cousin and fellow Donner Party survivor Eliza Poor Donner, with whom he had an additional seven children.

Death
Sherman Houghton died on August 31, 1914, aged 86, in Hynes, California. He is interred in Angelus-Rosedale Cemetery, Los Angeles.

Legacy
The Donner-Houghton House, an historic building in downtown San Jose, was built by Houghton in 1881. The building was placed on the National Register of Historic Places in 2002. A number of proposals have been made to either restore or renovate it. The structure was almost completely destroyed by a fire on the morning of July 19, 2007.

References

Bibliography
 . Genealogical history of the Donner family.

 
 

Mayors of San Jose, California
Union Army officers
1828 births
1914 deaths
People of California in the American Civil War
Politicians from New York City
Burials at Angelus-Rosedale Cemetery
Republican Party members of the United States House of Representatives from California
19th-century American politicians